The 1936 Stanford Indians football team represented Stanford University in the 1936 college football season. After winning three consecutive Pacific Coast Conference Championships the three prior seasons and the 1936 Rose Bowl on January 1, the Indians won only two games in head coach Tiny Thornhill's fourth season at Stanford.  With a 2–5–2 record, Stanford lost more games in the 1936 season than in the prior three seasons combined and produced the school's worst season since the 1899 season when the Indians finished with an identical 2–5–2 record. The team played their home games at Stanford Stadium in Stanford, California.

Schedule

References

Stanford
Stanford Cardinal football seasons
Stanford Indians football